Murad Meneshian (Baghdad, Iraq, 1936 - Glenview, Illinois, October 11, 2016) was a research chemist, journalist, translator, and researcher.

Of Armenian descent, he immigrated to the United States in 1957. He was an alumnus of University of Illinois (BS) and Texas Christian University (MS). He worked for Abbott Laboratories, Teletype Corporation, and AT&T/Lucent Technologies (Bell Laboratories) as an analytical chemist and had several patents in the field of science. His articles were published in the Proceedings of the Third International Symposium on Very Large Scale Integration Science and Technology. He engaged in many studies of Armenia and Mesopotamia. He translated from Armenian to English Vahan Hampartsumian's Giughashkharh and engaged in a study of the life and works of famed Armenian writer Raffi. As a result, he published the book Raffi: the prophet from Payajuk in 2010. For many years he was a regular contributor to the Armenian Weekly.

Works
Raffi: the prophet from Payajuk
Village World (Kiughashkharh): An Historical and Cultural Study of Govdoon (translated)

References

Ethnic Armenian historians
American chemists
American people of Armenian descent
Living people
1936 births